Ignjatije is a Serbian masculine given name, a variant of the Latin name Ignatius, from ignis, "fire". The shortened form is Ignjat, while hypocorisms include Ignjac and Ignjo.

Deacon Ignjatije, 14th-century Russian clergyman
Ignjatije, Metropolitan of Dabar-Bosna (s. 1841–51)
Ignjatije, 14th-century Bishop of Lipljan
Ignjatije, Bishop of Raška and Prizren (s. 1840–49)
Ignjatije Malobabić, 11th CK LKH member
Ignjatije Midić, current Bishop of Braničevo

See also
Ignatije
Ignjacije

Serbian masculine given names